The Mitsubishi Space Star is a car produced by the Japanese manufacturer Mitsubishi Motors from either 1998 or 1999 until 2005. Described as a hatchback, a compact people carrier, or a micro MPV, it was built at the NedCar factory in the Netherlands and was primarily sold in the European markets. In 2013, Mitsubishi began selling the sixth generation Mirage supermini under the Space Star name in parts of Europe, owing to legal rights relating to the use of the Mirage nameplate.

Overview

The Space Star shared its platform with the Mitsubishi Carisma and Volvo S40/V40. It was first introduced to the market in the autumn of 1998, replacing the Mitsubishi Space Runner. Production of the Space Star stopped in 2005. Since the car's introduction to the market its visual appearance stayed almost identical and it only received a minor facelift in 2002. In 2001, the Space Star was crash tested by Euro NCAP and received a three-star rating for the safety of its adult passengers, and a two-star rating for the safety of pedestrians.

All engines are straight-4 engines.

Nameplate reintroduction

The sixth generation Mitsubishi Mirage, released in 2012, is rebadged as the Mitsubishi Space Star in the European markets. It is a supermini car, in five-door hatchback body style, powered by a three-cylinder petrol engine.

Production and sales figures

(Production, sales sources: Facts & Figures 2000, Facts & Figures 2005, Facts & Figures 2007, Mitsubishi Motors website)

References

External links

Space Star
Mini MPVs
Euro NCAP small MPVs
Cars introduced in 1998
2000s cars
Front-wheel-drive vehicles
VDL Nedcar vehicles